Atotonilco el Bajo is a town in the municipality of Villa Corona; in the Mexican state of Jalisco.  According to the INEGI census of 2000: 2,255 people resided in the town. 

The meaning of Atotonilco comes from its Nahuatl roots: atotos which means "place", and nilco which means "strings of water".

References

Populated places in Jalisco